Saru Bhakta is the pen name of Bhakta Raj Shrestha, a celebrated Nepalese playwright, novelist, songwriter and poet and a winner of Madan Puraskar, one of the most prestigious literary awards in Nepal.

Biography 
He was born to Ganesh Bahadur Shrestha and Laxmi Shrestha in Bag Bazaar, Pokhara, Nepal on the day of Teej on 20 August 1955 (4 Bhadra 2012 BS). He studied in Gandaki Boarding School, Lamachaur. He completed his SLC level education from Rashtriya Secondary School (then Rashtriya Multiple School). He then received an IA degree from Amrit Science College, Kathmandu. He received his Bachelor degree from Prithvi Narayan Campus, Pokhra and received Master's degree from Tribhuvan University. He started writing around 1978.

Many consider his novel Pagal Basti, to be a classic in Nepalese literature. He was also a member of the Royal Nepal Academy and the Immediate Past Chancellor of Nepal Music and Drama Academy.

Associated Institutions 
 Founder: Rastriya Bal Prativa Puraskar , Pokhara (National Prize for Children) 
 Ex-Chairman: Pokhara Public Library , Pokhara
 Founder: Pokhreli Yuva Sanskritik Pariwar (A cultural organization)
 Founder: Yuva Natak Parivar (Younh dramatic group)
 Founder: Pratibimba Natya Parivar (Dramatic group of Pokhara)
 Co-ordinator: Conservation Poetry Movement (2055 B.S.)
 Member: Nepal Academy
 Chancellor: Nepal Music and Drama Academy

Bibliography 
Poetry Collections

 Banda Kham Bhitra (2035)
 Boksiko Ahwan ra Ghoshanapatra
 Kavi, Premi ra Pagal (2050)
 Kurup Mashiha (2054)
 JyanMaya (2056)
 Ka Purush (2057)
 Prayogshala Bhitra (2058)
 Manabhari Matobhari (2061)
 Etar Samaya (2061)
 Hajar Buddhsharu (2061)
 Jhuma (2061)
 Bhedigoth (2063)
 Cybercafema Ekdin (2064)
 Kholsawari Kholsapari (2065)

Plays

 Yuddha : Uhi Gas Chamber Bhitra (2037)
 Itihas Bhitrako Itihas (2041)
 Shishirka Antim Dinharu (2042)
 Ithar (2044)
 Gaungharka Natakharu (2050)
 BalBalikaharuko Naatak (2053)
 Asamay Amausam (2054)
 Nimabiya (2055)
 Ashadhammo Sanantano (2045)
 Jasto Dantyakatha (2057)
 Sirumarani (2061)
 Gauko Katha Yoesto Hunchha Hai (2061)
 Sharararthiharu (2063)

Fictions

 Ek Avinavko Atmakatha (2044)
 Chhori Brahmanda (2047)
 Pagal Basti (2048 )
 Taruni Kheti (2053)
 Yamagal (2054)
 Samay Trasadi (2058)
 Chulee (2059)
 Adhyaro Kotha (2060)
 Padarthaharuko Geet (2063)
 Pratiganda (2076)

Editorial

 Saraswat (Pokhareli Pratinidhi Kavita Sangraha, 2047)
 Siddhicharanka Jail Sansmaran (2052)
 Sangrachayar Kavita Yatra (2053)
 Saraswat (Trimonthly Nepali literary magazine, co-editor )

Award and Honor 
 International Distabled Year, Best Play(Drama) Award (2038 B.S.)
 First Prize Winner,  Trivuvan University Literary Competition (2039 B.S.)
 Busak Gold Medal, Nepal Jaysees (2039 B.S.)
 National Youth Festival, Best Play (Drama) Award (2041 B.S.)
 GAA Competition, Best Play Award (2041 B.S.)
 National Drama Festival, Royal Nepal Academy, Best Dramatist (2042 B.S.)
 Third Prize Winner, National Poetry Festival, Royal Nepal Academy (2035 B.S.)
 First Prize Winner, National Poetry Festival, Royal Nepal Academy (2042 B.S.)
 Yuva Barsa Moti Puraskar (2043 B.S.)
 Gai Jatra Hasya Byangya Mahotsav, Royal Nepal Academy, Sarvottam Byanga Muktakkar (2043 B.S.)
 Arohan Samman (2047 B.S.)
 Madan Puraskar (2048 B.S.)
 Lokendra Sahitya Puraskar (2051 B.S.)
 Ratna Shree Award (2052 B.S.)
 Nepal Bal Sahitya Puraskar (2054 B.S.)
 Siromani Puraskar (2054 B.S.)
 Kumudini Kala Sahitya Puraskar (2055 B.S.)
 Gopinath Aryal Rangamanch Puraskar (2056 B.S.)
 Ganesh-Khilkumari Duwal Prative Puraskar (2056 B.S.)
 National Drama Festival, 2056, Best Director and Recommendation Prize but rejected
 Ganki Basundhara Puraskar (2057 B.S.)
 Parvat Sahitya Samman, (2058 B.S.)
 Namaste Musical Honor (2056 B.S.)
 Birendra-Aishwarya Medal  (2058 B.S.)
 Thakali Sewa Samiti (Central) Honor  (2057 B.S.)
 Prithivi Narayan Campus, FSU Honor  (2059 B.S.)
 Music Nepal Honor (2058 B.S.)
 Upanyash Satabarsiki Samman  (2060 B.S.)
 Shukla Sahitya Puraskar  (2061 B.S.)
 Dabali Puraskar  (2062 B.S.)
 Sahitya Kunja Samman, Central Department of Nepali Kirtipur (2062 B.S.)
 America-Nepal Society Samman, Washington D.C.  (2062 B.S.)
 Antarastriya Nepali Sahitya Samman, D.C. Metro Chapter (2062 B.S.)
 New York Kala Manch Samman, New York (2062B.S.)
 Dhading Sahitya Samaj Samman  (2063 B.S.)
 Himali Sanskritik Parivar Samman  (2065 B.S.)
 Himdark Samman  (2067 B.S.)

References

External links
 Sarubhakta Official Page
 Poems of Sarubhakta @ Sanjaal

Nepalese male novelists
People from Pokhara
Living people
Nepalese male poets
Madan Puraskar winners
21st-century Nepalese poets
Nepalese dramatists and playwrights
Tribhuvan University alumni
Prithvi Narayan Campus alumni
1955 births